The Howard Center for Family, Religion and Society is a socially conservative U.S. think-tank and advocacy group that opposes abortion, divorce, and homosexuality, promoting instead the "child-rich, married parent" family.

History
The Howard Center for Family, Religion and Society was founded by John A. Howard in 1997. 
The Center traces its origins back to 1976 when John A. Howard, President of Rockford College formed the Rockford College Institute. This group later became The Rockford Institute.  In 1997 Howard and Allan C. Carlson broke from the Rockford Institute to form the Howard Center.  It incorporated the previous Center on Religion and Society, and took over publication of both The Religion and Society Report and The Family In America. 

It created and coordinates the World Congress of Families, a group known for its involvement with the 2013 Russian LGBT propaganda law and opposing LGBT rights internationally.

The current chairman of the board is Bill Andrews of Chicago, with a total of fifteen board members including Dallin H. Oaks who is an honorary board member.
As of 2018, the president was Brian S. Brown. 

The Howard Center for Family, Religion and Society and the International Organization for the Family, whose directors include an ultra-conservative Spanish activist linked to the leader of the far-right Vox party, both support the World Congress of Families (WCF) network.

Controversies 
In January 2012, Robert W. Patterson resigned from his job as an aide in Pennsylvania's Department of Public Welfare after Governor Tom Corbett's administration rejected a request to allow him to continue as editor of the Howard Center's journal, The Family in America. His column had proposed that "birth-control pills suppress women's sexual pleasure" and suggested "condom use deprives women of "remarkable chemicals" in semen that elevate their mood and self-esteem."

In November 2013, Senator Mark Kirk (R-IL) denied a meeting hosted by the Howard Center and the World Congress of Families access to a Senate meeting room. The meeting eventually went on as scheduled after House Speaker John Boehner (R-OH) intervened.

References

External links 
 

Think tanks established in 1997
Think tanks based in the United States
Conservative organizations in the United States